This is a list of National Natural Landmarks (NNL) in American Samoa. All locations are on communally owned lands.

American Samoa
American Samoa-related lists